Punggol Plaza is a shopping mall located in Punggol, Singapore, near Coral Edge LRT station. The mall is the oldest and one of the first to be built in Punggol to cater to the needs of the residents living there. It was officially opened in September 2004.

Background
Owned and managed by Abundance Development, Punggol Plaza was built to cater to the residents of Punggol, which was a newly built town during the completion of the mall in 2004.

Facilities and services

With a total of 4 floors and two basements, each level provides different services ranging from hair saloons, tuition centres, banks to food. There are currently three anchor tenants in the mall. The three anchor tenants include the Fresh Market, managed by Ai Muay Management, which is located at Basement 1, Koufu which is located on level 1 and NTUC FairPrice, which occupies most of the space on level 3.

The mall also has a 2-storey basement carpark. The carpark at B1 is accessible by both the lifts and escalators in the mall, while shoppers will have to take the lift to get to the B2 carpark. Shalom Car Grooming, a car grooming service, is located at the B2 carpark. There are also clinics offering general practitioner and specialist medical services located on the 1st and 2nd floors of the mall. There are also dental clinics located on levels 1, 2 and 4 of the shopping centre. There is currently one bank serving the mall, POSB Bank. It is located on the third floor. Most of the tuition centres are located on the fourth floor, including music schools such as Cristofori Music. Most of the hair salons are also located on the fourth floor.

Anchor tenants
 NTUC FairPrice
 Punggol Plaza Wet Market
 Koufu Food Court

Accessibility

Shuttle bus services
Free shuttle bus services have been provided by the mall since its opening in 2004. The free shuttle bus services are between Punggol New Town and Sengkang New Town, making travelling to the mall easier and more convenient.

Public transport
Coral Edge LRT station is located just in front of the mall, and the mall is also served by bus services 3, 62, 83, 381, 386, 569, 591, 593, 666, 729 and 744.

Gallery

See also
Oasis Terraces
Waterway Point
Compass One

References

Punggol
Shopping malls in Singapore
Shopping malls established in 2004
Tourist attractions in North-East Region, Singapore
2004 establishments in Singapore